Railways in Liberia comprised two lines from the port of Monrovia in the northeast, and one line from the port of Buchanan in the centre. The principal traffic is, or was, iron ore. In 2010, only the Bong mine railway was operational but the Lamco Railway was at least partially rebuilt by Arcelor Mittal and put back into service in 2011.

History

Infrastructure

Mano River Railway (1N) 
The  gauge Mano River railway primarily carried freight, but had very limited passenger service between Monrovia, Mano River terminal, Brewerville, Klay, Tubmanburg, and Mano River Mine. These are now disused, due to exhaustion of the Iron Ore deposits on the line.

Bong mine railway (2C) 
The Bong Mine railway was damaged during the civil war, and reopened in 2009. It had intermittent service to the following places:
  Monrovia Port
 Louisiana
 Sheshe
   Harrisburg
 Careysburg
 Kolata
   Motobli
   Yapagua
   Bong Mine

Lamco Railway (3S) 
The Lamco railway was originally built to take iron ore from mount Nimba - Yekepa Train station and Tokadeh to the port of Buchanan, for export. It fell into disuse and was damaged during the civil war, but has recently been rebuilt by Arcelor Mittal and was put back into service in 2011.

In 2022 a short extension across the border into Guinea to serve iron ore deposits there was proposed.

Simandou-Didia
In 2010, BSG Resources planned to build a cross-border line to export iron ore from mines near Simandou North (in Guinea) via the Liberian port of Didia. 51% of BSGR is now owned by Vale.  This line parallels the Lamco Railway for a considerable distance.

Accidents 
In January 2006, there was an accident on the Bong Mines railway; a train travelling from the mine to Monrovia collided with a makeshift wooden trolley used by locals (known as a "Make-away"). Two were killed.

Maps 
 UN Map

See also 

 Transport in Liberia
 Transport in Guinea just across the border.
 List of rail gauges

References